Evelio B. Javier Airport (Kinaray-a: Hurugpaan kang Evelio B. Javier, Hiligaynon: Hulugpaan sang Evelio B. Javier, Filipino: Paliparang Evelio B. Javier) , also known as San Jose Airport, and officially as Antique Airport is the only airport in the province of Antique in the Philippines. The airport is located in the provincial capital San Jose de Buenavista, and is classified as a Class 2 principal (minor domestic) airport by the Civil Aviation Authority of the Philippines, a body of the Department of Transportation that is responsible for the operations of not only this airport but also of all other airports in the Philippines except the major international airports.

The airport is named after Evelio Javier, a Marcos-critic politician who served as Antique's governor from 1971 to 1980 and was assassinated on February 11, 1986, just two weeks before the People Power Revolution. It was partially renovated with the help of Senator Loren Legarda and Antique Governor Rhodora Cadiao. The Airport Terminal Building and other Facilities is being planned for reconstruction to accommodate more passengers and planes. Prior to the renovation, the airport was not operational due to a lack of passengers travelling from Antique to Manila.

Airlines and destinations

Passenger

See also
List of airports in the Philippines

References

External links
 

Airports in the Philippines
Buildings and structures in Antique (province)
Transportation in the Visayas